Ravensthorpe Lower railway station served the area of Ravensthorpe, in the historical county of West Riding of Yorkshire, England, from 1869 to 1952 on the Ravensthorpe Branch.

History 
The station was opened as Ravensthorpe on 1 July 1869 on the Lancashire and Yorkshire Railway. To the northwest was the goods yard. Its name was changed to Ravensthorpe Lower on 30 September 1951. It closed to passengers on 30 June 1952, and goods on 1 January 1962.

Oil Terminal
With the closure of the LNWR line via , British Rail opened a spur, in 1966, from the Ravensthorpe Branch through to the Liversedge Spen to still operate the Charrington Hargreaves Oil Terminal. The Charrington Hargreaves Oil terminal was mothballed in 1986 and the line was ripped up in 1992.

Now
Sustrans and Kirklees Council have opened a cycle route, Spen Valley Greenway, on the track bed.

All that's left of the Ravensthorpe Station is the Goods Shed. Also, there's a 4-aspect signal just north of the existing railway line from Dewsbury to Mirfield.

Route

References 

Disused railway stations in West Yorkshire
Former Lancashire and Yorkshire Railway stations
Railway stations in Great Britain opened in 1869
Railway stations in Great Britain closed in 1952
1869 establishments in England
1952 disestablishments in England